MTV Music was a Greek pay television music channel that aired non-stop music videos, live performances and artist interviews and it was available only on OTE TV.

See also
Viacom International Media Networks Europe
Music of Greece

References

MTV channels
Defunct television channels in Greece
Greek-language television stations
Television channels and stations established in 2009
Television channels and stations disestablished in 2016
2009 establishments in Greece
2016 disestablishments in Greece
Music organizations based in Greece